The orange-spotted catshark or rusty catshark (Asymbolus rubiginosus), is a species of catshark, and part of the family Scyliorhinidae.

References

orange-spotted catshark
Marine fish of Eastern Australia
orange-spotted catshark